The George D. Oakley House at 2110 Kakela Place in Honolulu, Hawaii, was built in 1929 in the English Cottage style of architecture popular in Hawaii during the 1920s and 1930s. This house is one of the finest of only two dozen or so extant houses of similar style in the state. Signature elements of the style include asymmetrical massing, a roof shaped to resemble thatch, a gable with half-timbered facade, a king post truss ceiling, diamond-shaped casement windows, decorative as well as functional wrought iron, and even a tiny window in the chimney. Its architect was Miles H. Gray, an engineer with the U.S. Army Quartermaster Corps. The basement floor of acid-stained decorative concrete is also a rare surviving example of a technique pioneered by Robert D. Lammens during the 1920s. The house was listed in the National Register of Historic Places in 1984.

A native of Scotland, George Oakley arrived in Hawaii during the 1910s by way of the continental U.S. In 1920 he married Dean Spry and they lived in Kāneohe, where he managed a pineapple farm. After the farm ceased operations in 1923, he found work as a linotype operator and writer for the local newspapers until he retired in 1948. During the 1930s he served as music editor for the Honolulu Star-Bulletin, writing a regular column, "Music on the Tradewinds." The family also started a business to promote musical concerts, Artists' Services of Honolulu, which between the 1930s and early 1960s brought famous talents to perform in Honolulu, including Yehudi Menuhin, Arthur Rubenstein, and
the Vienna Boys Choir.

After the death of their daughter, Nancy Oakley Hedemann, in 2010, the house was put on the market, with a list price of $1.2 million.

Gallery

References

External links

Houses on the National Register of Historic Places in Hawaii
American Craftsman architecture in Hawaii
History of Oahu
Houses completed in 1929
Houses in Honolulu County, Hawaii
National Register of Historic Places in Honolulu County, Hawaii
1929 establishments in Hawaii